The following lists events that happened during 1913 in Tibet.

Events

January
 January 11 - Having recently proclaimed their independence from China, Tibet and Mongolia signed a mutual defense treaty that, under its terms, was "for all time".

References

 
1910s in Tibet
Years of the 20th century in Tibet
Tibet
Tibet